The Mazda Rally Team Europe was a rally team created by Achim Warmbold that competed in the World Rally Championship from 1985 to 1991.

History

The Mazda Rally Team Europe was created by Achim Warmbold as European Mazda preparation business based in Brussels, Belgium. Mazda headquarters appeared to ignore it. Although eventually Warmbold gained their attention, this did not seem to help the project much at first. Warmbold first created a Group A Mazda 323. This 323 was old fashioned and front wheel drive, but did feature a turbo engine. The 323 was short lived as it was only a warm-up for a Group B Mazda RX-7 with a Wankel engine. It managed to get a podium in the 1985 Acropolis Rally.

Mazda finally realized the potential for a rally team, but they did not want to support the Group B RX-7, and instead wanted to throw their effort behind a Group A 323 again. There was a new model 4x4 323 with a turbo engine, and it promised to be just as good as the Group B car, even though it was in a lower class. The timing of this project could not have been more perfect: the 323 4WD Turbo debuted in the 1986 Monte Carlo Rally. While this was before the Group B accidents at the Rally Portugal and the Tour de Corse, its launch was only one year away from the ban of Group B and by the time Group A became compulsory only Mazda had a well proven 4x4 turbo car. With Ingvar Carlsson and Timo Salonen at the wheel, the 323 AWD brought Mazda three wins in the World Rally Championship.

Drivers
Philippe Wambergue (1984)
Minna Sillankorva (1984)
Achim Warmbold (1984–1986)
Rod Millen (1985)
Ingvar Carlsson (1985–1990)
Timo Salonen (1987–1990)
Hannu Mikkola (1988–1991)
Grégoire De Mévius (1990)
Jesús Puras (1991)
Tommi Mäkinen (1991)

Group B Era (1984-1985)

Group A Era (1986-1991)

References

External links
World Rally Archive: Mazda's seasons

Mazda
World Rally Championship teams